Claysville is an unincorporated community in Marshall County, Alabama, United States.

History
Claysville was named in honor of Henry Clay, and served as the county seat of Marshall County from 1836 to 1838. During the American Civil War, Claysville became a strategic location, due to the ferry crossing of the Tennessee River. A Union Army garrison was located here during the latter part of the war. The 13th Wisconsin Volunteer Infantry Regiment was stationed here under the command of Colonel William P. Lyon.
A post office operated under the name Claysville from 1831 to 1879.

References

Unincorporated communities in Marshall County, Alabama
Unincorporated communities in Alabama